Two Rock is an unincorporated community in Sonoma County, California, United States. It is located on Stemple Creek in a rural area west of Petaluma.

The main road is Valley Ford Road, which passes northwest–southeast through Two Rock.

The Coast Guard's Training Center Petaluma is located just south of Two Rock.

Two Rock used to provide basic services to local ranches, but little remains today.

References

External links

Unincorporated communities in California
Unincorporated communities in Sonoma County, California